Ralph Cheshire (11 September 1893 – 13 June 1975) was a South African cricketer. He played in twenty-eight first-class matches for Border from 1913/14 to 1930/31.

See also
 List of Border representative cricketers

References

External links
 

1893 births
1975 deaths
South African cricketers
Border cricketers
People from Queenstown, South Africa
Cricketers from the Eastern Cape